Tobermory may refer to:

Places
 Tobermory, Mull, the chief town of the Isle of Mull in Scotland
 Tobermory (whisky distillery)
 Tobermory Single Malt Scotch whisky
 Tobermory High School
 Tobermory, Ontario, a town on the Bruce Peninsula, Ontario, Canada
 Tobermory Airport

Other
 Tobermory, the name of one of the Wombles
 "Tobermory", a 1911 short story by Saki about a cat of the same name, part of The Chronicles of Clovis

See also
 
 Tobermorite, a calcium silicate hydrate mineral found on Mull, Scotland